Bad Teacher is an American single-camera sitcom created by Hilary Winston, based on the 2011 film of the same title. The series aired on CBS from April 24 to July 26, 2014, as part of the 2013–14 American television season.

On May 27, 2014, CBS, which had already canceled the show after three episodes,<ref>{{cite web|url=https://www.deadline.com/2014/05/crazy-ones-cbs-cancelled-bad-teacher-hostages-bad-teacher/|title=CBS Cancels 'The Crazy Ones', 'Friends With Better Lives', 'Bad Teacher', 'Intelligence' & 'Hostages'|website=Deadline Hollywood|date=May 10, 2014|accessdate=May 10, 2014}}</ref> removed it from the schedule. However, the remaining episodes later aired as part of a summer burn off in July 2014.

Plot
Meredith Davis is divorced from her rich husband, who leaves her with nothing due to a prenuptial agreement that she clearly did not read. She moves in with her friend's family, whose stepdaughter Lily inspires her to come up with a plan – become hired as a teacher at Lily's school, Richard Nixon Middle School, meet and marry a rich single father, and return to the extravagant lifestyle to which she was accustomed. Using a fake résumé and her feminine charm, she gets Principal Carl Gaines to hire her. The faculty includes Joel, a former high school classmate who is now a gym teacher; Irene, a shy fellow teacher who becomes excited to have a new friend; and Ginny, faculty president who resents Meredith and is suspicious of her. Although an incompetent teacher, Meredith imparts life lessons to Lily and her friends.

Cast
Main
Ari Graynor as Meredith Davis, a former housewife who poses as a middle school teacher, in hopes to find a rich divorcé so that she can resume her upper-class lifestyle
Sara Gilbert as Irene, a socially awkward teacher at Richard Nixon Middle who is eager to become friends with Meredith
Ryan Hansen as Joel Kotsky, the school's gym teacher who knows Meredith from high school and is attracted to her, despite her obviously questionable motives
Sara Rodier as Lily, the stepdaughter of one of Meredith's friends and an unpopular student at the school
Kristin Davis as Ginny Taylor-Clapp, a self-serious and overzealous teacher who is immediately suspicious of Meredith
David Alan Grier as Carl Gaines, the recently divorced principal of Richard Nixon Middle who takes an instant liking to Meredith

Recurring
Caitlin Kimball as Kim Superfine, a student teacher who works with Ginny
Stuart Allan as James Pfaff, a student
Madison De La Garza as Kelsey, a student
Grace Kaufman as Bronwen, a student
Kat Foster as Brie, Meredith's friend at whose house Meredith lives after the divorce
Brett Gelman as Doug Pilaf, the school's eccentric math teacher
Colin Hanks as Coach Donnie, the school's other gym teacher

Production and development
The show was first reported to be in development on October 5, 2012, and received a pilot order on January 23, 2013. Don Scardino became attached to direct the pilot on March 13, 2013.

On February 18, 2013, David Alan Grier was the first to join the cast in the role of Carl. On February 19, Ari Graynor was cast in the lead role of Meredith. On February 21, Ryan Hansen was cast as Joel. On March 6, Sara Gilbert was cast as Irene. On March 13, Kristin Davis was cast as Ginny. Sara Rodier was also cast in the role of Lily, though this casting news received no announcement. On March 19, 2013, Caitlin Kimball joined the cast in a recurring role, portraying Kim.

On May 13, 2013, it was reported that the series would not receive a fall 2013 commitment from CBS. The series was absent entirely from the CBS 2013–14 schedule announced on May 15, 2013, however a series pickup was announced a week later on May 22.

The series premiered at 9:31PM on April 24, 2014. At its 2014–15 upfront presentation on May 10, CBS announced that the series had been canceled after airing only three episodes. After the fifth episode aired on May 22, the planned broadcasts of the sixth and seventh episodes were pulled from the schedule – being replaced with reruns of The Millers that had been previously scheduled to air at 8:31PM.

Episodes

Reception

Critical response
The series holds a rating of 51/100 on Metacritic, indicating "mixed or average" reviews, based on the reviews of 22 critics. On another review aggregation website, Rotten Tomatoes, it was given a score of 56% with an average rating of 5.2 out of 10, based on 25 reviews. The website’s consensus reads: " Ari Graynor's comedic talents are largely wasted on Bad Teacher, which reboots the same shtick from the movie with none of the edge". Ben Travers of Indiewire gave the pilot a D. Mitch Salem of ShowBuzzDaily.com gave the verdict of "Change the Channel". Verne Gay of Newsday'' also gave the show a D.

U.S. ratings

References

External links
 
 

2014 American television series debuts
2014 American television series endings
2010s American school television series
2010s American single-camera sitcoms
CBS original programming
English-language television shows
Middle school television series
Live action television shows based on films
Television series by CBS Studios
Television series by Sony Pictures Television
Television shows set in Los Angeles
2010s American workplace comedy television series
Television series about educators